GPN may refer to:

 Garden Point Airport, on Melville Island, Australia
 Global Pastors Network
 Global production network
 Green Party of the Netherlands
 Taiap language
 Gulaschprogrammiernacht, an annual 4-day congress of the Computer Chaos Club Karlsruhe